Spicy Hot in Love is a 2016 Chinese romance film directed by Xiao Fei and Zhang Changzheng. It was released in China on March 8, 2016.

Plot

Cast
Peter Ho
Qin Hao
Zhang Zilin Zhou Yiwei
Zhou Yiwei
Tian Yuan
Huang Acan
Zhang Xinyi
Hai Yitian
Ady An
Jin Zhiwen
Jack Kao
Liu Xin
Lee Hyun Zhen

Reception
The film has grossed  in China.

References

Chinese romance films
2016 romance films